Lectionary 32, designated by siglum ℓ 32 (in the Gregory-Aland numbering). It is a Greek manuscript of the New Testament, on parchment leaves. Palaeographically it has been assigned to the 11th-century.

Description 

The codex contains lessons from the Gospels of John, Matthew, Luke lectionary (Evangelistarium). It is written in Greek minuscule letters, on 273 parchment leaves, in 2 columns per page, 20 lines per page.
Carelessly written. 

The Greek text of the codex is a representative of the Caesarean text-type. 

Text of the codex was edited by Matthaei in 1791. C. R. Gregory saw it in 1889. 

The manuscript is cited in the critical editions of the Greek New Testament (UBS3).

Currently the codex is located in the Landesbibliothek (Memb. I 78) in Gotha.

See also 

 List of New Testament lectionaries
 Biblical manuscript
 Textual criticism

Notes and references

Bibliography 

 

Greek New Testament lectionaries
11th-century biblical manuscripts